"Fashion" is a single by the Finnish rock and glam punk band Hanoi Rocks from the album Street Poetry. The single was released on 16 May 2007 in Finland and Europe and on 21 June in Japan. The single rose to number one on the Finnish singles list on 23 May.

The single also featured a cover of the Billy Bremner song "Trouble Boys".

Before the album's release, the band's guitarist Andy McCoy said that every song on the album had single-potential, but "Fashion" happened to be the first finished song.

A music video was also made which depicted the band performing on a catwalk with fashion models.

Track listing 
"Fashion" – 3:18 (Monroe/McCoy)
"Trouble Boys" – 2:49 (Bremner)
"Fashion" (video)
"Boulevard of Broken Dreams" (video)

Personnel 
Michael Monroe – vocals
Andy McCoy – lead guitar
Conny Bloom – rhythm guitar
Andy Christell – bass
Lacu – drums

References 

Hanoi Rocks songs
2007 songs
2007 singles
Number-one singles in Finland
Songs written by Andy McCoy
Songs written by Michael Monroe